Mesophleps truncatella is a moth of the family Gelechiidae. It is found in Australia (Northern Territory, Queensland) and Vanuatu.

The wingspan is 8–14 mm. The forewings are greyish yellow, but the distal three-fifths of the costa is brown.

Etymology
The species name is derived from Latin truncatus (meaning truncate) and the postfix -ellus and
refers to the truncated caudal margin of the uncus in the male genitalia.

References

Moths described in 2012
Mesophleps